Martynas Echodas (born 7 July 1997) is a Lithuanian professional basketball player for Rytas Vilnius of the Lithuanian Basketball League (LKL) and the Basketball Champions League.

Playing career
Echodas was born in Kaunas, Lithuania. A product of Žalgiris' youth system, Echodas spent his first three seasons playing for Žalgiris-2 Kaunas of National Basketball League (NKL). On September 1, 2016, Echodas was loaned to BC Šiauliai of the LKL. On November 23, he recorded a career-high 30 points, 14 rebounds, and 37 efficiency points in a FIBA Europe Cup match against Pardubice.

In August 2017, Echodas signed a three-year contract with Rytas Vilnius. In his second year with Rytas, Echodas won the EuroCup's Rising Star Award for the 2018–19 season.  During 18 games played, he averaged 9.6 points, 5.1 rebounds and 11.7 point PIR rating, while shooting 62.6% from the field. He re-signed with the team on July 23, 2020.

On June 29, 2021, Echodas signed with Reyer Venezia of the Italian Lega Basket Serie A (LBA).

On July 1, 2022, Echodas returned to Rytas Vilnius, signing a contract until the end of the 2023–2024 season.

National team career
Echodas was part of the U-16 and U-18 Lithuanian youth teams that participated in the 2013 FIBA Europe Under-16 Championship and the 2015 FIBA Europe Under-18 Championship. In the latter tournament, he averaged 9.0 points, 6.1 rebounds and 1.1 blocks per game in just 18.2 minutes per game. On February 23, 2018, Echodas debuted as a member of the Lithuania men's national basketball team by scoring 5 points and grabbing 6 rebounds, and helped to defeat the Hungary national basketball team 80–75 during the 2019 FIBA Basketball World Cup qualification.

Personal life
Echodas is of Jewish descent (through his maternal grandfather).

References

External links
Martynas Echodas at fiba.com
Martynas Echodas at eurocupbasketball.com
Martynas Echodas at realgm.com

1997 births
Living people
Basketball players from Kaunas
BC Rytas players
BC Šiauliai players
BC Žalgiris-2 players
Centers (basketball)
Lithuanian expatriate basketball people in Italy
Lithuanian men's basketball players
Lithuanian people of Jewish descent
Power forwards (basketball)
Reyer Venezia players